Speakit Films is a British film production company established in 2004 by writer, director and producer team Nick Francis and Marc J. Francis.

The company is best known for the award-winning 2006 Sundance hit Black Gold and the acclaimed BBC, ARTE and VPRO co-production When China Met Africa. Their work has been supported by the Sundance Institute, the Channel 4 British Documentary Film Foundation, the UK Film Council, CNC and EU Media Fund.

Speakit's films have been released in cinemas and on television in over 40 countries (e.g.: BBC, Channel 4, Arte France, PBS, NHK, Al-Jazeera, NRK, SVT, VPRO, YLE, National Geographic and SABC).

In addition to producing feature documentaries, Speakit makes short films and works with organizations to help them tell their own story.

Productions
Black Gold (2006)
When China Met Africa (2010) 
Madam President (2012)
A Life on Hold (2012)
Rain is Beautiful (2012)

References

External links

Film production companies of the United Kingdom